Norbert Gajda (1 April 1934 – 16 September 1980) was a Polish footballer. He played in seven matches for the Poland national football team from 1961 to 1962.

References

External links
 
 

1934 births
1980 deaths
Polish footballers
Poland international footballers
Place of birth missing
Association football forwards
Odra Opole players